The Bacanga State Park is a state park in the state of Maranhão, Brazil.
It protects the main water supply for the city of São Luís, the Batatã reservoir.
The park's environment has been badly degraded through illegal occupation, logging, removal of sand, and garbage dumping. 
The water supply is threatened.

Location

The Bacanga State Park is the São Luís municipality of Maranhão.
It is just south of the city of São Luís, and north of the Região de Maracanã Environmental Protection Area, on the right bank of the Bacanga River.
It lies between residential zones with high demographic pressure and the industrial district.
The area surrounding the park had a population of 18,240 in 1991 and 60,564 in 2001.
There is no buffer zone to prevent environmental damage around the park.

The Sítio do Físico was one of the main industrial complexes of Maranhão in the early 19th century.
The extensive mangrove forests nearby provided the tannin used to tan leather.
The Brazilian Institute of Cultural Heritage (IBPC) is involved in preserving the Sítio do Físico.

Eletronorte electrical transmission lines cross the park from north to south.
The Batatã water reservoir is in the east of the park, to the west of the Marechal Cunha Machado International Airport.
The reservoir provides the main water supply for the city of São Luís and for 30% of  São Luís Island.

History

For centuries the state of Maranhão has followed a policy of extracting resources to supply the metropolis.
In recent years living standards have fallen, in part due to uncontrolled use of natural resources.
The area occupied by the park suffered from the uncontrolled growth of the city of São Luís, with damage including fires, extraction of timber and sand, garbage accumulation and so on.

The park was made the joint responsibility of the Secretariat of State for Natural Resources, Technology and Environment (SERNAT) and the water authority (CAEMA), who operates the reservoir.
Decree 7545 stated that the park's limits could be redefined to exclude areas that were irreversibly occupied or used, as long as this did not affect the characteristics of the park.

The reduction recognised that some areas had in fact been occupied and housing had been built.
The park management plan was prepared in 1998 and updated in 2001.
On 14 December 2001 another  of occupied land was excluded.

Environment

The park has poor laterite soil that is vulnerable to fires, deforestation, and erosion.
The climate is hot and humid.
It is in a flat, coastal area affected by tides, with mangroves. 
There are small hills and valleys in the centre of the park.
The park preserves a remnant of Amazon rainforest whose natural springs feed the Batatã Dam.
The park also provides an essential environmental service in recharging the aquifers below the city.

Threats

Maintenance activity on the electrical lines impacts the environment.
In 2001 there were small settlements with a total of 747 inhabitants within the park, felling trees, burning the vegetation and practising a primitive form of agriculture.
The responsible agencies, SEMA and CAEMA, were doing little to manage the situation, allowing informal occupation and construction in the park, deforestation, degradation of ravines and gullies and so on.

In 1995 satellite images showed that forest coverage was high forest 30.97%, low forest 25.90%, mangroves 17.37% and riparian forest 11.46%.
Forest covered more than 85% of the ground, while land used for agriculture, bare earth and buildings covered just over 9%.
In 2004 forest covered 80.61% of the area and disturbed land 16.1%.
Mangrove forest had been reduced from 17.37% to 10.82%, and high forest from 30.97% to 22.60%, while low forest had risen from 25.90% to 35.49%.
Deforestation had been caused by harvesting of timber for construction of houses and for firewood, and by removal of vegetation to allow stone and clay to be excavated for local sale.

Between 1995 and 2004 the area covered by surface water, mostly in the reservoir, decreased from 4.33% to 3.27%. 
The reservoir was projected to continue shrinking, with the land around it used for construction.
In 2003 the reservoir was almost empty in dry periods.

Notes

Sources

State parks of Brazil
Protected areas of Maranhão
1980 establishments in Brazil
Protected areas established in 1980